Schidium is a large genus within the subfamily Emesinae, distributed in the Palaearctic, Afrotropical, Oriental, and Australian
Regions.

About 50 species have been described.

Partial list of species
Schidium confine Wygodzinsky, 1966

References

Reduviidae